Theatre in education (TIE) originated in Britain in 1965 and has continued to the present day. Monica Prendergast and Juliana Saxton cited TIE as "one of the two historic roots of applied theatre practice". TIE typically includes a theatre company performing in an educational setting (i.e. a school) for youth, including interactive and performative moments.

The idea of a high-impact, child-centred performance for a specifically targeted school audience became hugely popular. Due to small audiences, students are encouraged to participate through work in-role and through debate. Student experimentation can be supported with resource materials and training or support for the students by teachers.

Need 

Education is becoming like rote learning. The education the students are getting is not being applied creatively in any area. Contrary to this rote education, TIE presents a different approach, including discussions, contributions and creativity through performance. It fulfills all types of learning and enhances the development process.

Difference between Drama in Education and Theatre in Education 

In the last twenty years, many books have appeared describing drama and theatre activities with children. These various labels are indicative of the range of the work and of the possible confusions that can arise. Some of the main areas of work are:

Drama in Education
In the school curriculum, this is both a method and a subject. As a curriculum subject, it uses various dramatic elements and acting out. In many high schools, drama is now a separate department. In some primary schools, it is used to teach a number of subjects.

Theatre in Education
A professional team of trained and experienced actor-teachers who prepare relevant material, project, and experiments to be presented in schools often involving more than one visit. These programmes are usually devised and researched by the team/teachers, and are for small groups of one or two classes of a specific age. The aim of the programmes is educational, and uses theatre, drama in education, and teaching techniques for educational purposes. This work provides an educational aid, resource, and stimulus for both teachers and pupils, but to do so it may vary from place to place, total participation sessions to performance and discussion. Theatre in Education can be considered a method of work used by some companies all the time, and only occasionally by others. Many companies who use this method start from a strong left-wing or didactic approach to their subject matter, and they cannot be considered as mere tools of the education system. Rather, they act as outside questioners, looking at ideas and values in society.

The main element of TIE 

These are the following characteristics of TIE
There is a clear aim and educational objective throughout the process.
The cast should be small, so actors must be versatile and often take several roles.
The project must be low-budget so that actors can play instruments. 
The production must be portable, with a simple, representational production design.
It must explore issues from various viewpoints to see the effect of the action upon a range of people.
There should be audience involvement.
They are rarely wholly naturalistic due to frequent narration.
As actors have multiple roles, the costumes are representational and simple.
It may include facts and figures to educate the audience.
The production may have a strong message or moral throughout.

How TIE can be used 

TIE can create different kinds of productions:
Supported by resource materials, the production can be designed to stimulate reaction and participation from its small audience through role-play and debate. 
By specifically targeting an area for a particular age group in a school's personal, social and health education curriculum.
For a young audience, the production can be based on the traditional story, allowing a range of follow-up activities if desired.
Linking the story to the given activities for very young children can provide opportunities for involvement. 
For adults, some additional 'dramatizing' activities may be added; e.g. learning parenting skills or preparing for employment.
It should be organised meaningfully.

In Schools 

The Role of Teacher 

As an alternative to knowledge dissemination, memory-based teaching, Drama games and fun during lessons leads to better engagement. Instead of lecturing, the teacher in the TIE setting can become a conceptual artist who moulds knowledge, feelings, thoughts, sensations, and experience into an active and stimulating educational process. This is not about an artist in a traditional way. It's more a way of thinking, perceiving the world and its needs in a right-brained way as non-linear, practical, intuitive, and holistic.
Teacher's typology 
The teacher's personality influences the use of drama in lessons. According to Barucha, teacher types fall into four quadrants (see Figure 1). Barucha differentiates two dimensions depending on the teacher's behaviour, perception, values, and attitudes: the interactivity level and the level of logical/emphatic thinking. Both dimensions operate on a whole scale in between the extreme values.

The Role of Student

In this methodology, the student need to understand that the role of the teacher changes. In TIE, the student himself takes the initiative and responsibility. TIE demands greater independence of thought. In this process of structured learning, drama rehearsals require full dedication. Due to this and closer interpersonal interaction, the process can lead to more clashes compared to traditional class teaching. There are several issues apart from memory training, courage to act, and the ability to emerge from the shell that each of us adopts at work or at school; there can be language difficulties, stage fright, newness in being expected to adopt a role, confidence, etc.

Summarizing the main requirements and preconditions as follows:
Intellectual maturity, ability to understand the play and roles
Ability to comprehend the cost and investment, but also the benefits. Openness to new methods of teaching and learning
Time management or commitment
Acceptance of guiding role of the teacher without formal authority
Language competence
Performance skills/competence (active attitude to potential stage fright issues, memory issues etc.)
Collective work competence 
Controlling emotional intelligence and ability to cooperate even in stressful moments (like a performance)

Some theatre improvisation games
Here are some theatre games.

1) Alphabet conversation

In a group of students, start a conversation one by one where each sentence begins with the next letter of the alphabet. Giving examples before you begin will help the student. Students can also use sounds to start a sentence, for example “Mmmm” or “tut-tut”. This game can be played in pairs or small groups. Here is an example:
 
A:   Anyone seen my cat?

B:   Black one, with funny eyes?

A:   Can't say I remember.

B:   Don't tell me you've forgotten what it looks like?

A:   Every cat looks the same to me.

B:   Fortunately, I found one yesterday.

A:   Gee, that's great...

Try starting somewhere in the middle of the alphabet. Then when you reach “Z”, return to “A” until you arrive back where you started. This technique can be combine with one-word stories.

2) People poems

Divide the class into small groups of four or five. To each group give a topic or word; e.g. “Time”. Now each person in each group has to write down or remember words associated with the theme - slow, fast, boredom, quickly, and centuries. Each group has to make an object out of the members, linked to the theme (such as a clock). Ideally the group's object should move. 
Next, each group must bring the object to life and work out a way to bring in some or all of their words - linked to their movements. At the end they show the resulting people poem to the rest of the class, who try to guess the theme.
Themes can include: 
 Elements - earth, air, fire, water 
 Opposites – cold/hot, fast/slow, high/low 
 Colours
 Emotions

Benefits 
These are some benefits of TIE:

 Self-Confidence: By performing in front of an audience, the student gains confidence and trust in his own ideas and abilities. This will be applied to his life, career, and school.
 
 Imagination: Thinking outside of the box and interpreting familiar material in new ways. Albert Einstein said, “Imagination is more important than knowledge.”
 
 Empathy: Acting out different situations, time periods, and cultures promotes compassion and tolerance for others’ feelings and viewpoints.
 
 Collaboration: Combines new ideas and abilities of its participants. This cooperative learning includes discussing, sharing, negotiating, rehearsing, and performing.
 
 Concentration: Performing in a play develops focus of mind, body, and voice, which also helps in life and in school subjects.
 
 Communication Skills: Acting enhances verbal and nonverbal expression of ideas. It also improves voice projection, articulation of words, and fluency with language. 
 
 Emotional Outlet: In the play the student is allowed to express a range of emotions. Sadness, aggression, and tension are released in a safe, controlled environment, reducing antisocial behaviours.
 
 Relaxation: Theatre activities reduce stress by releasing mental, physical, and emotional tension.
 
 Physical Fitness: Movement in drama improves body balance, coordination, flexibility, and control.

References

External links 
Applied Drama
Drama in Education

 
Performing arts education in the United States
Performing arts education